The 2011 Castilla y León Cup (Spanish: Copa Castilla y León 2011) is the third edition of this football trophy in its renewed version.

Teams participants

Calendar

The schedule and format of the tournament was decided by Castilla y León Football Federation.

Matches

First round

Second round

Quarterfinals

Semifinals

Final
The draw will be held in September 2011. The venue will be also drawn. The Final Match will be played on 5 October 2011.

References

See also
Castilla y León Cup

2011
2011–12 in Spanish football cups